Columbia Pictures Television, Inc. (abbreviated as CPT) was launched on May 6, 1974, by Columbia Pictures as an American television production and distribution studio. It is the second name of the Columbia Pictures television division Screen Gems (SG) and the third name of Pioneer Telefilms. For 26 years, the company was active from 1974 until New Year's Day 2001, when it was folded into Columbia TriStar Television (which is currently known as Sony Pictures Television), a merger between Columbia Pictures Television and TriStar Television. A separate entity of CPT continues to exist on paper as an intellectual property holder, and under the moniker CPT Holdings (the initials standing for Columbia Pictures Television) to hold the copyright for the TV show The Young and the Restless, as well as old incarnations from the company's television library such as What's Happening!!

History

Screen Gems (1948–1974) 
Screen Gems was a television production company that was owned by Columbia Pictures from 1948 to May 6, 1974, best known for shows like Bewitched, The Partridge Family and I Dream of Jeannie. It was one of the largest television producers in history, and it was around that time, one of the few TV subsidiaries of a major movie studio that didn't carry the film studio's name. It was highly profitable until 1974, when it was changed its name to Columbia Pictures Television.

Re-incorporation as CPT and early years (1974–1982)
The studio changed its name from Screen Gems to Columbia Pictures Television on May 6, 1974, and was suggested by David Gerber, who was producer on such CPT/Screen Gems shows, and now executive vice president of the studio, displacing Art Frankel when he was at Screen Gems. He announced plans to launch a separate unit to concentrate on movie-of-the-week titles. John H. Mitchell, who was president of the studio since 1958 when the studio was Screen Gems, said that they would take the division more closely to the parent company and to help achieve an interrelationship among all of its divisions.

As the successor in interest to Screen Gems, it assumed productions of the daytime soap operas Days of Our Lives and The Young and the Restless, as well as the NBC police show Police Story. Its first produced series is the sitcom That's My Mama and was originally slated to be a Screen Gems production. Other new productions that were slated to be Screen Gems productions were Nakia, Born Free and Police Woman.

On May 27, 1974, Columbia Pictures Television is planning on to syndicate as early as 1975, ten one-hour musical specials that was set to be taped in Las Vegas nightclubs, and the programs will be simulcast on FM Radio to be set up by Yuri Zabran. In September 1974, Columbia had signed Abby Mann to develop long-form television projects, and the first project to came out of the deal was Medical Story.

In 1975, Carl Reiner joined Columbia Pictures Television to serve as executive producer and host of the show Good Heavens, which was for the ABC television network. Also, on July 1, 1975, former NBC vice president Larry White had set up his own production company Larry White Productions with a deal at Columbia Pictures Television. On May 10, 1976, White then joined the studio to displace Gerber as his program chief, who subsequently restarted plans to launch its own CPT-based production company.

On June 13, 1977, CPT acquired worldwide distribution rights to Barney Miller and Fish from Danny Arnold, Quinn Martin's Barnaby Jones, and Soap from Witt/Thomas/Harris Productions. On June 27, CPT bought domestic distribution rights to four series made by Spelling-Goldberg Productions including S.W.A.T., Starsky & Hutch, Charlie's Angels, and Family from Metromedia. Later on in 1977, former MGM Television president Harris Katleman and Universal Television producer Harve Bennett joined forces to form Bennett/Katleman Productions with a deal at the studio. Also in 1978, Larry White was then promoted to president of the studio.

From 1978 to 1986, CPT co-produced series with Spelling-Goldberg including Fantasy Island, Hart to Hart, and T. J. Hooker. On February 19, 1979, CPT acquired TOY Productions, whose output included What's Happening!! and Carter Country. In 1981, Richard Dawson has signed a joint development contract with Rastar Television and Columbia Pictures Television to produce TV shows. On August 13, 1981, CPT acquired the television assets of Time Life. A year later, Columbia (which Time-Life Television became a part of its sisters television company) joined with HBO and CBS to form TriStar Pictures.

On May 17, 1982, Columbia Pictures acquired Spelling-Goldberg Productions for more than $40 million. Around the same year, former ABC executive Barbara Corday started a new Columbia-affiliated production company Can't Sing Can't Dance Productions.

The Coca-Cola Years (1982–1989)
The 1980s brought significant changes to CPT. On June 22, 1982, beverage company The Coca-Cola Company bought Columbia Pictures for $750 million. In 1983, Coca-Cola formed CPT Holdings and demerged CPT from Columbia Pictures Industries in 1984 and transferred CPT to CPT Holdings. In 1983, actress Suzanne Somers through Hamel/Somers Productions had signed a deal with the studio. Also that same year that producer Roy Huggins struck a deal with the studio. Also that year, Columbia Pictures Television entered into an agreement with producer Centerpoint to co-produce two miniseries Sadat and The Last Days of Pompeii.

On January 30, 1984, CPT joined forces with Lexington Broadcast Services Company by creating a joint venture between the two companies called Colex Enterprises to distribute library shows such as Father Knows Best and The Monkees, while throughout the 1980s and 1990s, other shows such as Bewitched, I Dream of Jeannie, and The Partridge Family were licensed to The Program Exchange. The same year, CPT acquired distribution rights to Benson. In late 1984, Barbara Corday took over as president of the studio. Another high-profile deal at CPT arrived in August 1984 when two of the high-profile independent producers North Ave. Productions (backed by Michael S. Baser and Kim Weiskopf) signed with CPT after leaving 20th Century Fox Television, while George Schenck and Frank Cardea through Schenck/Cardea Productions reupped its contract with CPT.

On June 18, 1985, Norman Lear and Jerry Perenchio sold their company, Embassy Communications, Inc. (Embassy Pictures, Tandem Productions, and Embassy Home Entertainment) to Coca-Cola. The company gained the rights to such shows as All in the Family, Sanford and Son, The Jeffersons, Good Times, Maude, Diff'rent Strokes, Archie Bunker's Place, The Facts of Life, One Day at a Time, Who's the Boss?, and Silver Spoons, among others. AITF at the time however, was still distributed by Viacom Enterprises but under license by Embassy. Coke also made plans to spin-off Embassy Pictures and Embassy Home Entertainment. Under Coca-Cola's ownership, Embassy saw success with 227 and Married... with Children. The same year, Columbia and LBS Communications launched What's Happening Now!! in first-run syndication. The show was a sequel to the 1970s ABC sitcom What's Happening!!. Also that year, Barney Rosenzweig via his The Rosenzweig Company banner had inked a three-year, distribution deal with the studio to distribute their own projects.

Major changes took place in 1986. On May 5, Coke acquired Merv Griffin Enterprises, producer of the popular series, Dance Fever, The Merv Griffin Show, and the two game shows, Jeopardy! and Wheel of Fortune; (the nighttime versions were distributed by King World, which is now handled by successor CBS Media Ventures). However, Sony Pictures Television handles off-net syndication reruns by broadcasting them on Game Show Network, while sister company Sony Pictures Home Entertainment owns DVD rights, though, as game shows, are unlikely to get a proper release). On May 21, 1986, Joe Indelli was resigned as president of Columbia Pictures Television Distribution, in order to launch a new company that was owned by MTM Enterprises to syndicate its own programs and Robert King, who was partner of The Television Program Source, would replace it as CPTD's president of the studio.

Also in 1986, the former Lear units (Embassy Television, Embassy Telecommunications, and Tandem Productions) were merged to become Embassy Communications; the Tandem unit ceased production to be used after the cancellation of Diff'rent Strokes but remained in-name-only, while the Columbia and Embassy units continued to exist separately. Also on the same year on August 28, CPT acquired Danny Arnold's Four D Productions, Inc. for $50 million. On November 24, 1986, Coca-Cola regrouped CPT, Embassy Communications, and Merv Griffin Enterprises into Coca-Cola Television, which was a division of the entertainment sector of The Coca-Cola Company, and Coke formed a new first-run syndication unit; Coca-Cola Telecommunications due to Coca-Cola merging the distribution unit of Columbia Pictures Television and The Television Program Source (a syndicator that was a joint venture between Alan Bennett, former King World president Robert King, and CPT that was created on October 15, 1984, which Coca-Cola had a small investment in originally, and notably distributed the 1985–1986 nighttime syndicated version of The Price Is Right and was slated to distribute a new version of Match Game for syndication in 1987). It was headed by Gary Rosenthal, who was leading Embassy Telecommunications, and also inserted was a new subsidiary Coca-Cola Television Operations. On September 9, 1986, Columbia Pictures Television's European division is expanding its branch, producing programming for ITV franchisee holders, such as HTV, and added new co-productions from other ITV franchisees such as Anglia Television and Yorkshire Television.

Coca-Cola Telecommunications also took some programs that were or slated to be distributed under the Columbia Pictures Television banner including What's Happening Now!!, The Real Ghostbusters, Dinosaucers, and Punky Brewster as well as taking the US distribution rights of Hardcastle and McCormick from Colex. Columbia acquired the rights to Punky, a former NBC in-house production, because Financial Interest and Syndication Rules prevented the network from producing more episodes for syndication after they cancelled it. During the fall of 1986, the sitcom Designing Women began a successful seven-year run on CBS. The same year, Tri-Star Pictures formed Tri-Star Television and produced the short-lived series Downtown. Tri-Star produced more series in 1987, Take Five, Nothing in Common, My Two Dads, Werewolf, and Buck James. Also that same year, Clyde Phillips joined the studio as an independent television producer.

In 1987, a major reorganization shook up at Columbia/Embassy Television, whereas Embassy employee Glenn Patrick resigned to start his own film and television production company, and Barbara Corday was appointed president at the organized studio. The Columbia name would now be used for dramatic shows, while the Embassy name would be used for comedic output. Owing to the association with Castle Rock Entertainment with the movie studio, CPT signed on to handle international distribution and off-net syndication of Castle Rock's programs, because Columbia had a 40% interest in the studio.

Columbia Pictures Entertainment (1987–1989)
On December 21, 1987, Coca-Cola spun off their entertainment holdings and sold it to Tri-Star Pictures, Inc. for $3.1 billion. Tri-Star was renamed as Columbia Pictures Entertainment (which they partially owned) after the film Ishtar turned out to be a notorious failure both critically and financially. CPT Holdings then became a stand-alone division from CPT.

In January 1988, Columbia/Embassy Television and Tri-Star Television were formed to create the new Columbia Pictures Television and Embassy Communications was reduced as in-name-only and was renamed as ELP Communications as the copyright holder for the shows by Embassy. Meanwhile, Coca-Cola Telecommunications and Embassy Communications (the distributor arm) were merged into the new Columbia Pictures Television Distribution. All shows in the era ended with the Columbia logo between 1988 and 1991.

As a result, many of the staff, including Barbara Corday, who had been as president of the studio since 1984 has been laid off, as well as former Coca-Cola Telecommunications presidents Herman Rush and Peter Seale, who had also been laid off and replaced mostly by Tri-Star alumnus, such as Scott Siegler, who was president of the studio, and former Columbia/Embassy executives were assigned to the new unit, namely Gary Lieberthal, who had the same title as Columbia/Embassy, would assume the position of the new CPT, and Barry Thurston, president of CET, will have the same title for the new CPT. Other executives retained by CPE were Arnold Mesnser, who was previously president of Tri-Star Telecommunications, who took over the responsibilities of Rush and Seale will have still have an unspecified corporate operation at CPE's headquarters for the New York area, allowing Herman Rush and Peter Seale had plans to set up a new syndicated company to handle the former CCT product. On February 2, 1988, Barry Thurston; vice-president of Columbia/Embassy Television, became president of Columbia Pictures Television Distribution. On December 26, 1988, writer Pamela Pettler signed a deal with the studio.

On February 2, 1989, Columbia Pictures Television formed a joint-venture with Norman Lear's Act III Communications called Act III Television to produce television series instead of managing.

The Sony years to the end (1989–2001)
On November 8, 1989, Sony bought Columbia Pictures Entertainment for $3.4 billion and the next day, Sony acquired The Guber-Peters Entertainment Company (formerly game show production company Barris Industries with the library of game shows including The Newlywed Game, The Dating Game, and The Gong Show) for $200 million after hiring film producers Peter Guber and Jon Peters to run the company. On November 5, 1990, CPE folded its first-run syndication unit Guber-Peters Television into Columbia Pictures Television Distribution. On August 7, 1991, CPE changed its name to Sony Pictures Entertainment and TriStar Television was relaunched on October 10.

Throughout the 1990s, the studio launched such successful shows as Beakman's World on TLC and CBS in 1992, Mad About You on NBC in 1992, Ricki Lake in syndication which lasted 11 years, The Nanny on CBS in 1993, Party of Five on Fox, NewsRadio on NBC, Malcolm & Eddie on UPN in 1996, and the short-lived cult following animated series The Critic on ABC and Fox in 1994. One of the most successful by far was Seinfeld, a Castle Rock Entertainment production which Columbia distributed in off-net syndication years later.

On August 21, 1992, Columbia's subsidiary CAT Holdings, Inc. (Columbia Act III Television) and Franklin/Waterman Entertainment created a joint venture called Franklin/Waterman 2. On December 7, 1992, Sony Pictures acquired the Barry & Enright Productions game show library. In 1992, CPT has the potential by possibly going off-net syndication rights to a company backed by a joint venture between RHI Entertainment and Trilogy Entertainment Group. Later that year, director Jonathan Lynn had signed a deal with the studio to develop their own television projects, including an NBC series commitment.

On May 10, 1993, CPT and MCA TV formed their barter divisions. CPT's barter division was called Columbia Pictures Television Advertising Sales (a.k.a. "Columbia Television Advertising Sales"). The sales division handled series by TriStar Television and Merv Griffin Enterprises; as well as off-net series by Castle Rock Entertainment, HBO Independent Productions, and Brillstein-Grey Entertainment. CPT used other companies such as Group W Productions for Beakman's World, MTV's One World Entertainment for Married... with Children, and Tribune Entertainment for Designing Women.

Merger with TriStar Television, restructuring, and expansion (1994–2001)
On February 21, 1994, after takeover by Sony Pictures Entertainment, Columbia Pictures Television and TriStar Television merged under the leadership of Jon Feltheimer and the two combined studios became Columbia TriStar Television. After the merger, Columbia Pictures Television Distribution was renamed as Columbia TriStar Television Distribution.

During that year, SPE acquired a vast back catalog of independently produced game shows with the acquisition of Stewart Television. Along with the Merv Griffin, Chuck Barris, Barry & Enright, and CPT game shows they've already owned, these were part of the basis of the Game Show Network, launched on December 1, 1994. In 1998, ELP Communications became an in-name unit of Columbia TriStar Television. In 1997, most new shows, as well as some existing CPT shows like Party of Five, dropped the CPT logo and begin putting the CTT logo in its place, and also in January 1997, changed monikers from Sony Television Entertainment to Columbia TriStar Television Group.

On July 1, 2000, Barry Thurston stepped down as president of Columbia TriStar Television Distribution after 17 years and was succeeded by then-current president, Steve Mosko. On January 1, 2001, Columbia Pictures Television officially dropped its separate logo and it was replaced by that of Columbia TriStar Television, with Days of Our Lives being the last known show to feature the separate CPT logo, just in time when NBC started doing split-screen credits. On October 25, 2001, CTT and CTTD merged to form Columbia TriStar Domestic Television.

On September 16, 2002, Sony Pictures changed the name of its TV division as Sony Pictures Television.

See also
 List of Sony Pictures Television programs
 Sony Pictures Television
 Columbia TriStar Television
 TriStar Television
 Screen Gems
 Columbia Pictures
 TriStar Pictures
 Triumph Films

Notes and references

Bibliography
 Perry, Jeb H. (1991). Screen Gems: A History of Columbia Pictures Television from Cohn to Coke, 1948-1983. .

Television production companies of the United States
Television syndication distributors
Sony Pictures Television
Predecessors of Sony Pictures Television
Sony Pictures Entertainment
Entertainment companies based in California
Companies based in Culver City, California
Entertainment companies established in 1974
Mass media companies established in 1974
Mass media companies disestablished in 2001
1974 establishments in California
2001 disestablishments in California